TeleSoft Partners is a venture capital firm located in Aspen, Colorado.

The firm
TeleSoft Partners provides capital to high-tech and energy value chain companies specializing on the internet, wireless, software, systems, applications, and services industries. TeleSoft typically invests $1-$15 million per company and is stage agnostic, including investments across companies in the early, development & expansion, and late stages of their development life cycle.  The firm has raised capital commitments of $625 million and focuses on approximately 25-30 investments per fund.

TeleSoft was founded in 1996 by Arjun Gupta, a member of the investment group that purchased the Sacramento Kings in 2013.

Investments
TeleSoft has been an investor in 61 technology companies, resulting in over 40 acquisitions to date. Notable investments include: Salesforce.com, Skype Qik, LiteScape Technologies, Calix Inc., Validity Sensors, Ikanos Communications, VoiceObjects, Nexant, Lara Networks, Zantaz, Cerent Corporation, Tele Atlas, and Loglogic.

References

External links
 TeleSoft Partners Homepage

Companies based in San Francisco
Financial services companies established in 1996
Privately held companies based in California
Venture capital firms of the United States